The 171st Massachusetts General Court, consisting of the Massachusetts Senate and the Massachusetts House of Representatives, met in 1979 and 1980 during the governorship of Edward J. King. William Bulger served as president of the Senate and Thomas W. McGee served as speaker of the House. In 1980, the General Court voted to establish the Massachusetts Board of Regents of Higher Education with the authority to consolidate resources for public higher education in the state.

Senators

Representatives

See also
 96th United States Congress
 List of Massachusetts General Courts

References

Further reading

External links
 
 
 
 
 
 
  (1964-1994)

Political history of Massachusetts
Massachusetts legislative sessions
massachusetts
1979 in Massachusetts
massachusetts
1980 in Massachusetts